Sharafdar Kola-ye Sofla (also Romanized as Sharafdār Kolā-ye Soflá) is a village in Esfivard-e Shurab Rural District, in the Central District of Sari County, Mazandaran Province, Iran. At the 2006 census, its population was 844, in 208 families.

References 

Populated places in Sari County